Bessen is a surname. Notable people with the surname include:

James Bessen (born 1950), American economist 
Mervyn Bessen (1913–2002), Australian sportsman

See also
Bassen